The 2002 Stanford Cardinal football team represented Stanford University in the 2002 NCAA Division I-A football season. In head coach Buddy Teevens's first season at Stanford, the Cardinal won only two games, ending the season with a 2–9 record, the school's worst since a 1–10 season in 1983.

The team played their home games at Stanford Stadium in Stanford, California and competed in the Pacific-10 Conference.

Schedule

Roster

Coaches

Game Summaries

at Boston College

San Jose State

at Arizona State

at Notre Dame

Washington State

Arizona

at UCLA

at Oregon

USC

Oregon State

at California

References

Stanford
Stanford Cardinal football seasons
Stanford Cardinal football